Kolnik  is a village in the administrative district of Gmina Pszczółki, within Gdańsk County, Pomeranian Voivodeship, in northern Poland. It is located within historic region of Pomerania.

The village has a population of 503.

Kolnik was a private church village of the monastery in Pelplin, administratively located in the Tczew County in the Pomeranian Voivodeship of the Polish Crown.

References

Kolnik